Embellish is the second official extended play release by the American electropop music artist, The Jellyrox.

Background
The EP's production was heavily covered via The Jellyrox's Tumblr blog.

On January 10, 2013, Matt Langston revealed he had begun to work on a new EP and hoped to have it out sometime in the spring.  Through his blog, Langston began a series of ten posts updating fans on the progress of the new release.  After a few weeks, a pre-order of the Embellish EP was announced and set on The Jellyrox'''s official store.  Fans who pre-ordered the record got it as early as a month in advance.  Embellish debuted on iTunes April 23, 2013.

Matt Langston stated his reasons for his naming the EP, Embellish, when he said:

 Track listing 

Reception
The EP received overall favorable reviews from different music sites and even garnered a rare 5-star rating from New Release Tuesday: "If you've been looking for an electronic album that is as exceptional as it is unpretentious, this is a project for you. Between the shimmering synth builds and the whimsically young yet honest lyrics, this is a collection that truly shines. Blending just the right amount of reflection and tongue-in-cheek cleverness in the lyrics, Matt Langston has created an EP that is solid from beginning to end both musically and lyrically." ~ Elraen of NRT2014-present
On February 19, The Jellyrox announced via his Facebook that a music video was in the works for the track, "Your Oasis."  Through various forms of social media in July, Matt Langston indicated that the music video is in pre-production and filming.

Awards
The EP was nominated for "Best EP of the Year" in the 2013 We Love Christian Music awards.

NotesEmbellish was the first Jellyrox release to ever be available in a physical format.  After the release, Langston went back and made his previous release, Heta Himlen available in a hard copy format via the "Embellish Special" on his official online store.
In the first verse of the track, "Fade To Fiction," Langston makes a subtle reference to the song "Starlight" off his original Jellyrox EP release. 
Following the release, Langston made the acoustic version of "Rebel Tide" available on Bandcamp.  
A live recording from the release party of Embellish was posted in late June in which Langston performed Soft Cell's "Tainted Love".  The song was released on The Jellyrox's SoundCloud with a download option for the first hundred to find it.
The singles, "Someone Else," "Rebel Tide," and "Rebel Tide (Coffee House version)," have begun being played on three different radio stations.
In the rough draft of the Embellish'' track listing, a seventh song entitled "Fade To Fiction (Acoustic)" was seen.  However, this track has never been released.

References

2013 EPs
Electronic EPs
Electropop EPs